Juho Tuomikoski (14 December 1888 – 20 June 1973) was a Finnish long-distance runner. He competed in the marathon at the 1920 Summer Olympics.

References

External links
 

1888 births
1973 deaths
Athletes (track and field) at the 1920 Summer Olympics
Finnish male long-distance runners
Finnish male marathon runners
Olympic athletes of Finland
People from Ilmajoki
Sportspeople from South Ostrobothnia